Irish Junior Cup may refer to:

 Irish Junior Cup (ladies' hockey)
 Irish Junior Cup (men's hockey)